The following are notable terrorist incidents (non-state) that have happened in Sri Lanka. The list is in chronological order and it does not include attacks to military bases or military personnel, who were engaged in duty during the Sri Lankan civil war or JVP insurrections. A number of terrorists attacks have occurred in Sri Lanka, specially during the periods of civil war (1983-2009) and the second JVP insurrection (1987 -1989). Sri Lanka is one of the nations which has experienced some of the worst terrorist attacks that have occurred worldwide, with 100 or more fatalities over the last 100 years.

Incidents by decade

1980s

1990s

2000s

2010s

See also
 Terrorism in Sri Lanka
 1988 Maldives coup d'état
 List of battles and other violent events by death toll
 List of terrorist incidents in France
 List of terrorist incidents in Indonesia
 List of terrorist incidents in Pakistan since 2001

Notes

References

 
Sri Lanka
Terrorist incidents
Terrorist incidents